Heritage of Mercury. Almadén and Idrija is a joint UNESCO World Heritage Site in Almadén, Castile-La Mancha, Spain, and Idrija, Slovenia. The property encompasses two mercury mining sites. In Almadén mercury has been extracted since Antiquity, while in Idrija it was first found in 1490.

The sites bear testimony to the intercontinental trade in mercury which generated important exchanges between Europe and America over the centuries. The two sites represent the two largest mercury mines in the world and were operational until recent times. Mercury played an important role in extracting gold and silver from ores, dug in American mines. In addition, both sites illustrate the various industrial, territorial, urban and social elements of a specific sociotechnical system in the mining and metal production industries.

At the heart of the Almadén site is a Mining Park, where the public can go underground.
There are also buildings relating to the town's mining history, including Retamar Castle, the San Rafael Mining Hospital (now an archive), and eighteenth-century dwellings which form a hexagonal bullring.

The site in Idrija notably features mercury stores and infrastructure, as well as miners’ living quarters, and a miners’ theatre.

Nomination process

Idrija begun the process to inscribe the mercury heritage to the UNESCO's heritage list in 2006. Initially, the nomination was made together with Huancavelica mercury mine in Peru, in relation to the intercontinental route Camino Real. In the second stage, a nomination focused on mercury heritage in relation to silver mining, together with San Luis Potosí mine in Mexico - however, the nomination did not gather sufficient support. The third, successful stage of the nomination focused on mercury mining in relation to technological and industrial processes that influenced the economical and cultural development of the two regions.

List of registered monuments 

The elements of the "Mercury Heritage" are the following:

Almadén

Idrija

References

See also
 Almaden Quicksilver County Park

World Heritage Sites in Slovenia
World Heritage Sites in Spain
Mercury mining
Mining museums in Spain
Mining in Slovenia
Foreign relations of Spain
Foreign relations of Slovenia
Idrija